John Carpenter is an American film director, producer, writer and composer.  He has contributed to many projects as either the producer, writer, director, actor, composer or a combination of the five.

Films

Acting roles

Highest-grossing films
This is a list of films directed by John Carpenter that grossed more than $10 million at the US box office according to Box Office Mojo. Carpenter's films have grossed domestically a total of more than $282 million, with an average of $18 million per film.

Television
TV movies

TV series

Video games

See also
 John Carpenter's unrealized projects

References
General

 
 
 

Specific

External links
 

American filmographies
Carpenter, John
Filmography